Breaking Point is a 2009 action-thriller film starring Tom Berenger, Busta Rhymes, Musetta Vander and Sticky Fingaz. It is directed by Jeff Celentano with a screenplay written by Vincent Campanella. The film was showcased in Cannes and was released theatrically on December 4, 2009.

Cast
 Tom Berenger as Steven Luisi 
 Busta Rhymes as Al Bowen 
 Armand Assante as Marty Berlin 
 Musetta Vander as Celia Hernandez 
 Frankie Faison as Judge Green 
 Sticky Fingaz as Richard Allen (as Kirk 'Sticky Fingaz' Jones) 
 Curtiss Cook as Byron Young
 Jill Nicolini as 	Veronica Taylor

References

External links
 

2009 films
2009 action thriller films
2000s American films
2000s English-language films
American action thriller films
Films directed by Jeff Celentano
Films scored by Pinar Toprak